Christian Kirchberger (born 20 January 1944) is an Austrian ice hockey player. He competed in the men's tournament at the 1964 Winter Olympics.

References

1944 births
Living people
Austrian ice hockey players
Olympic ice hockey players of Austria
Ice hockey players at the 1964 Winter Olympics
Place of birth missing (living people)
20th-century Austrian people